Weltner is a surname of Swiss German origin. Notable people with the surname include:

Charles L. Weltner (1927–1992), American politician
Edgar P. Weltner, American football and basketball player
Peter Weltner, German organist and keyboardist

References

Swiss-German surnames